Grampus may refer to:

Animals
Grampus, the genus and another name for Risso's dolphin, Grampus griseus
A synonym of the genus Orcinus
Another name for Orcinus orca, the killer whale or orca
Another name for the hellbender, a species of salamander
Another name for Mastigoproctus giganteus, a species of whip scorpion

Ships
CSS Grampus, an American river steamer built in 1856 and used by the Confederate States Army during the American Civil War
, the name of a number of Royal Navy ships and submarines
, a fisheries research and fish-culture ship in commission with the United States Commission on Fish and Fisheries from 1886 to 1903 and as USFS Grampus with the United States Bureau of Fisheries from 1903 to 1917 
, the name of a number of ships of the United States Navy
Grampus-class submarines, a group of minelaying submarines built for the British Royal Navy in the late 1930s
A versatile attack, reconnaissance and research submarine used by the Blue Fleet in the anime series Blue Submarine No. 6

Sports
Nagoya Grampus, an association football club based in Nagoya, Japan

See also 
 Krampus, a mythical figure